Da Rond Tyrone Stovall (born January 3, 1973) is a former American professional baseball player. He currently coaches high school baseball in Webster Groves, Missouri.

References

External links

1973 births
Living people
African-American baseball coaches
African-American baseball players
Albuquerque Dukes players
American expatriate baseball players in Canada
Baseball coaches from Missouri
Baseball players from St. Louis
Berkshire Black Bears players
Calgary Cannons players
Edmonton Trappers players
Gulf Coast Expos players
Harrisburg Senators players
Johnson City Cardinals players
Major League Baseball outfielders
Montreal Expos players
Ottawa Lynx players
Pennsylvania Road Warriors players
San Antonio Missions players
Savannah Cardinals players
Somerset Patriots players
Springfield Cardinals players
St. Petersburg Cardinals players
West Palm Beach Expos players
21st-century African-American sportspeople
20th-century African-American sportspeople